Eslamabad (also Romanized as Eslāmābād) is a village in Howmeh Rural District, in the Central District of Bam County, Kerman Province, Iran. At the 2006 census, its population was 223, in 60 families.

References 

Populated places in Bam County